The Catholic Encyclopedia: An International Work of Reference on the Constitution, Doctrine, Discipline, and History of the Catholic Church (also referred to as the Old Catholic Encyclopedia and the Original Catholic Encyclopedia) is an English-language encyclopedia published in the United States and designed to serve the Catholic Church. The first volume appeared in March 1907 and the last three volumes appeared in 1912, followed by a master index volume in 1914 and later supplementary volumes. It was designed "to give its readers full and authoritative information on the entire cycle of Catholic interests, action and doctrine".

The Catholic Encyclopedia was published by the Robert Appleton Company (RAC), a publishing company incorporated at New York in February 1905 for the express purpose of publishing the encyclopedia. The five members of the encyclopedia's Editorial Board also served as the directors of the company. In 1912 the company's name was changed to The Encyclopedia Press. Publication of the encyclopedia's volumes was the sole business conducted by the company during the project's lifetime.

Purpose
The encyclopedia was designed to serve the Catholic Church, concentrating on information related to the Church and explaining matters from the Catholic point of view. It records the accomplishments of Catholics and others in nearly all intellectual and professional pursuits, including artists, educators, poets and scientists. While more limited in focus than other general encyclopedias, it was far broader in scope than previous efforts at comprehensive Catholic encyclopedias, which covered only internal Church affairs.

It offers in-depth portrayals of historical and philosophical ideas, persons and events, from a Catholic perspective, including issues that divide Catholicism from Protestantism and other faith communities. Since the encyclopedia was first published starting in 1907 and has never been updated (versus the New Catholic Encyclopedia), many of its entries may be out of date either with respect to the wider culture or to the Catholic ecclesiastical world. In particular, it predates the creation of the Vatican City State (1929) and the Second Vatican Council (1962–1965), which introduced changes to Catholic practice.

History
The writing of the encyclopedia began on January 11, 1905, under the supervision of five editors:
 Charles G. Herbermann, professor of Latin and librarian of the College of the City of New York
 Edward A. Pace, professor of philosophy at The Catholic University of America in Washington, D.C.
 Condé B. Pallen, editor
 The Rev. Thomas J. Shahan, professor of Church history at The Catholic University
 The Rev. John J. Wynne, S.J., editor of Messenger of the Sacred Heart

The first edition was initially printed by Robert Appleton Company. The volumes came out sequentially, the first two in 1907 and the last three in 1912:

The editors had their first editorial meeting at the office of The Messenger, on West 16th Street, New York City. The text received a nihil obstat from an official censor, Remy Lafort, on November 1, 1908, and an imprimatur from John Murphy Farley, Archbishop of New York. This review process was presumably accelerated by the reuse of older authorized publications. In addition to frequent informal conferences and constant communication by letters, the editors subsequently held 134 formal meetings to consider the plan, scope and progress of the work, culminating in publication on April 19, 1913. A first supplement was published in 1922; a second supplement in nine loose-leaf sections was published by The Gilmary Society between 1950 and 1958.

In 1912, a special completely illustrated, commemorative volume was awarded to those patrons who contributed to the start of the enterprise by buying multiple encyclopedia sets early on.

There was controversy over the presence of the Catholic Encyclopedia in public libraries in the United States with nativist protests that this violated the separation of church and state, including a successful appeal in Belleville, New Jersey.

The encyclopedia was later updated under the auspices of The Catholic University of America and the New Catholic Encyclopedia was first published in 1967, and then in 2002.

Authors and sources
The Catholic Encyclopedia and Its Makers states that:

The work is entirely new, and not merely a translation or a compilation from other encyclopedic sources. The editors have insisted that the articles should contain the latest and most accurate information to be obtained from the standard works on each subject.

However, "from standard works" allows that some of the articles from European contributors such as Pierre Batiffol (French) and Johann Peter Kirsch (German) had previously been published in whole or in part in Europe and were translated and edited for the Encyclopedia. Those who wrote new articles in English include Anthony Maas and Herbert Thurston.

Online versions
Under copyright law of the United States, all works published in the United States before 1928 are in the public domain. In 1993, Kevin Knight, a 26-year-old resident of Denver, Colorado, decided, during the visit of Pope John Paul II to that city for World Youth Day, to launch a project to publish the 1913 edition of the encyclopedia on the Internet. Knight founded the Web site New Advent to host the undertaking. Volunteers from the United States, Canada, France, and Brazil helped in the transcription of the original material. The site went online in 1995, and transcription work ended in 1997.

In 2007, Catholic Answers published a watermarked version derived from page scans. This version has since been replaced with a transcription of the Encyclopedia similar to that found at the New Advent site. The Catholic Answers transcription, however, is an exact transcription of the original text, whereas the New Advent version at times modernizes certain words (e.g., using the names of Old Testament books found in modern Bibles, such as "1 & 2 Chronicles" and "Obadiah", in place of the Vulgate/Douay–Rheims titles, such as "1 & 2 Paralipomenon" and "Abdias") and Biblical citation formatting (i.e., the Catholic Answers version retains the original's usage of Roman numerals for chapter numbers [e.g., Genesis I,1], while the New Advent version uses Arabic numerals throughout [e.g., Genesis 1:1]).

Other scanned copies of the 1913 Encyclopedia are available on Google Books, at the Internet Archive, and at Wikimedia Commons. Wikisource also hosts a transcription project backed by the scans hosted at Commons.

The 1922 supplement to the Encyclopedia is also in the public domain and is available online.  The New Catholic Encyclopedia also is available online at some libraries.

See also
 Encyclopaedia Biblica
 The Jewish Encyclopedia
 Lists of encyclopedias
 New Catholic Encyclopedia
 Orthodox Encyclopedia
 Thomas F. Woodlock – a member of the board of directors for the project and contributor of several articles within it

Notes

Citations

General bibliography

External links

 Catholic Encyclopedia at Catholic Answers
 Catholic Encyclopedia on New Advent
 Catholic Encyclopedia on Catholicity
 Catholic Encyclopedia full text via Hathi Trust

1907 non-fiction books
20th-century encyclopedias
American online encyclopedias
Reference works in the public domain
Catholic media
Christian encyclopedias
English-language encyclopedias